Master-General of the Ordnance is a senior position in the General Staff of the Sri Lanka Army, the post is a head by a senior officer of the Major General rank. The Master-General of the Ordnance's Branch is responsible for procurement and maintenance of vehicles and special equipment of the Sri Lanka Army. 

Coming under the preview of the Master-General of the Ordnance's Branch is the following Directorates;
Directorate of Ordnance Services
Directorate of Ordnance Procurement Services

Past Masters-General of the Ordnance
Major General G.L. Sigera
Major General Asoka Thoradeniya
Major General Kamal Gunaratne
Major General Dhammika Liyanage
Major General Jagath Gunawardena
Major General Prasanna Chandrasekera

References & External links
Arms and men

Sri Lanka Army appointments